Thermi is a Southeastern suburb and a municipality in the Thessaloniki regional unit, Greece. Its population was 53,201 at the 2011 census. It is located over the site of ancient Therma.

Municipality

 

The municipality Thermi was formed at the 2011 local government reform by the merger of the following 3 former municipalities, that became municipal units:
Mikra
Thermi
Vasilika
 
The municipality Thermi has an area of 382.106 km2, the municipal unit Thermi has an area of 100.943 km2, and the community Thermi has an area of 55.90 km2.

Education

Pinewood - The American International School is located in Thermi.

References

Municipalities of Central Macedonia
Populated places in Thessaloniki (regional unit)